The 2012 Busan Open Challenger Tennis was a professional tennis tournament played on hard courts. It was the tenth edition of the tournament which was part of the 2012 ATP Challenger Tour. It took place in Busan, South Korea between 7 and 13 May 2012.

Singles main-draw entrants

Seeds

 1 Rankings are as of April 30, 2012.

Other entrants
The following players received wildcards into the singles main draw:
  Chung Hong
  Jeong Suk-young
  Na Jung-Woong
  Nam Ji-sung

The following players received entry from the qualifying draw:
  Kim Cheong-eui
  Michael McClune
  Christopher Rungkat
  Kento Takeuchi

Champions

Singles

 Tatsuma Ito def.  John Millman, 6–4, 6–3

Doubles

 Yuki Bhambri /  Divij Sharan def.  Hsieh Cheng-peng /  Lee Hsin-han, 1–6, 6–1, [10–5]

External links
Official Website

Busan Open Challenger Tennis
Busan Open
May 2012 sports events in South Korea
Busan